Baba Kamal (also Romanized as Bābā Kamāl; also known as Bābā Kamāl-e Soflá) is a village in Dinavar Rural District, Dinavar District, Sahneh County, Kermanshah Province, Iran. At the 2006 census, its population was 254, in 63 families.

References 

Populated places in Sahneh County